Flaminio Baudi di Selve (7 July 1821, Savigliano – 26 June 1901, Genoa) was an Italian entomologist who specialised in Coleoptera but also Heteroptera.

He wrote Europae et circummediterraneae Faunae Tenebrionidum specierum, quae Comes Dejean in suo Catalogo, editio 3, consignavit, ejusdem collectione in R. Taurinensi Musaeo asservata, cum auctorum hodierne recepta denominatione collatio. Pars tertia. Dtsch. Entomol. Z. 20: 225–267 (1876), Catalogo dei coleotteri del Piemonte Torino, Tip. e. Lit. Camilla E. Bertolero (1889) and very many shorter works on beetles. He described many new species.

His insect collection, mainly Palearctic is shared between Museo Civico di Storia Naturale di Genova, Turin Museum of Natural History and Museo Regionale di Scienze Naturali Regione Piemonte

References
Conci, C. 1975 Repertorio delle biografie e bibliografie degli scrittori e cultori italiani di entomologia. Mem. Soc. Ent. Ital. 48 1969 (4) 817–1069, 841.
Conci, C. & Poggi, R. 1996: Iconography of Italian Entomologists, with essential biographical data. Mem. Soc. Ent. Ital. 75 159–382.418 figures.Portrait.

External links
Important Works on Staphylinidae pdf
Internet Archive Digitised Catalogo dei coleotteri del Piemonte
Museo Regionale di Scienze Naturali Regione Piemonte  
DEI ZALF Portrait, obituary and biography list.

1821 births
1901 deaths
People from Savigliano
Italian entomologists